Ewa Petelska (24 December 1920 – 20 August 2013) was a Polish film director and screenwriter. She directed 26 films between 1951 and 1985. Her 1963 film Black Wings (Czarne skrzydła) was entered into the 3rd Moscow International Film Festival where it won a Silver Prize. Her 1973 film Copernicus (Kopernik) was entered into the 8th Moscow International Film Festival where it won the Silver Prize.

She often collaborated with her husband, Czesław Petelski.

Selected filmography
 Ogniomistrz Kaleń (1961)
 Black Wings (1963) 
 Tortura nadziei (1967)
 Kwestia sumienia (1967)
 Copernicus (1973) 
 Kazimierz Wielki (1976)

References

External links

1920 births
2013 deaths
Polish women film directors
Polish film directors
Polish screenwriters
Polish women screenwriters
People from Września County